Scholars Run is a tributary of Connoquenessing Creek in western Pennsylvania.  The stream rises in southwestern Butler County and flows south entering Connoquenessing Creek at Harmony, Pennsylvania. The watershed is roughly 36% agricultural, 53% forested and the rest is other uses.

References

Rivers of Pennsylvania
Tributaries of the Beaver River
Rivers of Butler County, Pennsylvania